Rosa is a surname with multiple etymologies. In Italian and Catalan, it means "rose" (flower). It is also a Portuguese and Spanish language surname. Variants include Da Rosa or da Rosa, De Rosa or de Rosa, and DeRosa or DaRosa. In Polish, Czech, and Slovak, it means "dew".

People

Rosa
 Aaron Rosa (born 1983), American mixed martial arts fighter
 Antonín Rosa (born 1986), Czech footballer
 Charles D. Rosa (1870–1959), American politician and judge
 Don Rosa (born 1951), American comic book writer and illustrator
 Francesco Rosa (died 1687), Italian painter
 Francis Rosa (1920–2012), American sports journalist
 Gabriela Rosa (born 1966), American politician
 Hermann Rosa (2011–1981), German sculptor and architect
 João Guimarães Rosa (1908–1967), Brazilian writer
 Kacper Rosa (born 1994), Polish footballer
 Lucien Rosa (born 1944), Sri Lankan long-distance runner
 Luiz Pinguelli Rosa (1942–2022), Brazilian scientist
 Márcio Rosa (born 1997), Cape Verdean footballer
 Marco Rosa (born 1982), Canadian ice hockey player
 Marek Rosa (born 1979), Slovak video game producer and designer
 Michał Rosa (born 1963), Polish movie director
 Monika Rosa (born 1986), Polish politician
 Orlando Rosa (born 1977), Puerto Rican wrestler
 Paulo Sérgio Rosa (born 1969), Brazilian footballer
 Pavel Rosa (born 1977), Czech ice hockey player
 Sam Rosa (1866–1940), Australian socialist and journalist
 Salvator Rosa (1615–1673), Italian painter

De Rosa or de Rosa
 Alberto Fernández de Rosa (born 1944), Argentine actor
 Ángel María de Rosa (1888–1970), Argentine sculptor and philanthropist
 Anna Palm de Rosa (1859–1924), Swedish artist and landscape painter
 Antonino De Rosa (born 1981), Italian-American gamer
 Clem De Rosa (1925–2011), American musician
 Diana de Rosa (1602–1643), also known as Annella di Massimo, Neapolitan painter
 Domenica De Rosa (born 1963), British crime novelist
 Eugene De Rosa (1894– 1945), Italian-American architect
 Fernando de Rosa (1908–1936), Italian failed assassin
 Franco De Rosa (born 1944), Italian actor
 Gaetano De Rosa (born 1973), Italian footballer
 Gianni De Rosa (1956-2008), Italian footballer
 Pacecco De Rosa (1606–1656), Italian painter
 Raffaele De Rosa (born 1987), Italian motorcycle road racer
 Tommaso de Rosa (1621–1695), Roman Catholic bishop
 Tullio De Rosa (1923–1994), Italian enologist
 William De Rosa, American cellist
 Yvonne De Rosa (born 1975), Italian photographer

DeRosa
 Anthony DeRosa, American animator
 Jon DeRosa (born 1978), American singer
 Mark DeRosa (born 1975), American baseball player
 Melissa DeRosa, American former government official
 Stephen DeRosa (born 1968), American actor
 Tina DeRosa (1944–2007), American writer
 Vincent DeRosa (1920–2022), American musician

Da Rosa or da Rosa
 Aldo da Rosa (1917–2015), Brazilian electrical engineer
 Gonzalo de los Santos da Rosa (born 1976), Uruguayan footballer
 Jair da Rosa Pinto (1921–2005), Brazilian footballer
 Thiago da Rosa Correa (born 1982),  Brazilian footballer

De la Rosa or de la Rosa
 Pedro de la Rosa (born 1971), Spanish racing driver

See also
 Rosa (given name)
 Rosas (surname)
 Rosa (disambiguation), includes De Rosa
 Rose (disambiguation)
 DeRose

References

Czech-language surnames
Italian-language surnames
Polish-language surnames
Portuguese-language surnames
Slovak-language surnames
Spanish-language surnames